Pantosperma holochalca is a species of sedge moth, and the only species in the genus Pantosperma. It was described by Edward Meyrick in 1888. It is found in New Zealand.

References

Moths described in 1888
Glyphipterigidae
Moths of New Zealand
Endemic fauna of New Zealand
Taxa named by Edward Meyrick
Monotypic moth genera
Endemic moths of New Zealand